Shanghai Dianji University is a public municipal college in Shanghai, China.  

Despite its self-designated English translation name, this institution has not been granted a university status by the Government of China.

Academics
In addition to engineering, other specialties include science, arts, economics, and management. The teaching schools are School of Electrical Engineering, School of Mechanical Engineering, School of Electrical Information Engineering, School of Business, School of Foreign Languages, School of Arts and Science, School of Automobile, School of Advanced Vocational Technology, School of Marxism, Department of Mathematics and Physics Education, and Center of Physical Education.

In addition, the Industrial Training Center and Physical Education Center conduct experiments and practical training, physical education respectively. The School of Continuing Education and Shanghai Li Bin College for Electric Technicians hold adult degree education and non-degree training. Shanghai Dianji University has 28 undergraduate degrees specialties.

There are over 12,500 full-time degree and diploma students at school. There are 898 staff members, including 484 professional teachers, 192 professors and associate professors.

History
Shanghai Dianji University, established in 1953, by holding to the spirit of "progressing with the excellence", became a key school in the 1950s and 1960s. The university's name was changed to Electrical Engineering University in 1954. The university's name was changed to Mechanical Engineering University in 1956. In 1970, the school was forced into dissolving. In 1978, the university was opened again, with the new name of Shanghai Dianji University.

Leadership

 President: Hu chen
 Vice president: Chen Xin, Huang Xinghua, Jiao Bin, Yang Ruofan
 Secretary of the Party Committee: Hao Jianping
 Deputy Party Secretary: Huan Xiufang

Schools and colleges 
 School of Electrical Engineering
 School of Electrical Information Engineering

Notable alumni 

Qiao Renliang

References

Educational institutions established in 1953
Universities and colleges in Shanghai
Engineering universities and colleges in China
1953 establishments in China